Senet or senat (cf. Coptic ⲥⲓⲛⲉ /sinə/ "passing, afternoon") is a board game from ancient Egypt that consists of 10 or more pawns on a 30 square playing board. The earliest representation of senet is dated to E from the Mastaba of Hesy-Re, while similar boards and hieroglyphic signs are found even earlier, including in the Levant in the Early Bronze Age II period.  Even though the game has a 2000-year history in Egypt, there appears to be very little variation in terms of key components. This can be determined by studying the various senet boards that have been found by archaeologists, as well depictions of senet being played throughout Egyptian history on places like tomb walls and papyrus scrolls. However, the game fell out of use following the Roman period, and its original rules are the subject of conjecture.

Evidence of Senet Over Time 

Fragmentary boards that could be senet have been found in First Dynasty burials in Egypt, E. The first unequivocal painting of this ancient game is from the Third Dynasty tomb of Hesy (c. 2686–2613 BCE). People are depicted playing senet in a painting in the tomb of Rashepes, as well as from other tombs of the Fifth and Sixth Dynasties (c. 2500 BCE). There are depictions of individuals such as Tutankhamun and Nefertari (wife of Ramsses II) playing senet in tomb art as well.

Senet is depicted in ancient texts, including in Chapter 17 of the Book of the Dead, where the individual who has died plays the game against an invisible opponent. The game of senet is also depicted in a scene depicted on papyrus dating from roughly 1250 - 1150 BCE that shows a lion and a gazelle playing senet (in the possession of the British Museum).

A game that could be senet is also referenced in the ancient Egyptian literary work that has been given the title in modern times of The Tale of Setne Khaemqaset and the Mummies. In this story, Naneferkaptah challenges Setne to a board game, with the winner taking a book he had been looking for as a prize.  The game in this story is not explicetly stated, however similarities such as the religious implications and structure of the game support the idea that it could be senet being depicted.

Senet in the Archaeological Record 
The oldest intact senet boards date to the Middle Kingdom, but graffiti on Fifth and Sixth Dynasty monuments could date as early as the Old Kingdom. However, there have been no actual senet boards that have been dated to the Fourth through Sixth Dynasties, just evidence that they did exist from depictions in tombs. In a painting from the Third Dynasty tomb of Hesy-Re, a senet game is depicted along with other boardgames from this era.

A study on a senet board in the Rosicrucian Egyptian Museum, dating back to the early New Kingdom of Egypt, showed the evolution of the game from its secular origins into a more religious artefact. However, the archaeological context of this senet board in question is unknown - it was acquired by the Rosicrucian Museum in London in 1947, and due to poor archaeological practices of the time, the provenance at this point appears to not have been recorded.

Outside of Egypt 
Some historians believe that senet could have originated in the Levant before Egypt, however due to Egypt's involvement in the Levant, Egyptian influence could have brought the game with.  Senet was also adopted in Cyprus around the end of the third millennium BCE and continued until at least the Bronze Age. 

Though some historians argue that senet essentially disappeared after the Romans, there are some examples of senet graffiti on the roof of the Roman Temple of Dendera, which dates to the Roman period, and which would be the most concrete evidence that the game was played or did exist to some extent during the Roman period

Gameplay

Unfortunately, due to the game falling out of use during the Roman period, the exact detailed rules of play are relatively unknown.

The senet board itself was usually constructed out of wood, ivory, faience or some combination of these materials, and the layout of the board was a grid of 30 squares, arranged in three rows of ten. A complete senet game set would have contained a distinct set of pawns for each of the two players. At least by the New Kingdom, these pieces were in the form of hounds or dog-headed figurines. Through most of the game's 2000-year history, the senet boards themselves would indicate the direction of play, usually from the top left corner and indicated by the decorations on the spaces, with the last five squares were often the most decorated on the board. The decorations on the last five squares were unique, usually having a mark related to goodness or an aquatic reference on them.

At least by the New Kingdom in Egypt (1550–1077 BCE), the game reflected the concept of the ka passing through the duat - represented in the game by the spaces connecting the individual to different stages of their lives. This connection is made in the Great Game Text, which appears in a number of papyri, as well as the appearance of markings of religious significance on senet boards themselves.

Modern Interpretation 
Although details of the original game rules are a subject of some conjecture, historians Timothy Kendall and R. C. Bell have made their own reconstructions of the game rules. These rules are based on snippets of texts that span over a thousand years, over which time gameplay is likely to have changed. Therefore, it is unlikely these rules reflect the exact course of ancient Egyptian gameplay. However, their rules have been adopted by sellers of modern senet sets.

Various other Egyptologists have also tried to reconstruct the game, however frequently these are discredited with more archaeological research/finds regarding the subject.

See also
 Khaemweset - real individual Setne was based off of
 Hounds and Jackals – ancient Egyptian board game
 Mehen – another ancient Egyptian game
 Royal Game of Ur – a Mesopotamian game played  3000 BC
 Tâb – a Middle Eastern game that is sometimes confused with senet

References

Citations

Further reading

External links

 
  Rules speculation. 
 
  Senet compared with the Royal Game of Ur

History of board games
Ancient Egyptian culture
Traditional board games
African games
Egyptian inventions
Historical tables games